Special Needs is a dark comedy/satire about three reality TV producers creating show about people with physical and mental disabilities. The film was written, produced, and directed by Isaak James, who also starred.

Critical response
DVD Talk rated it "highly recommended", calling it "an instant candidate for independent comedy of the year ". Variety called it "a rip-roaring good time" that succeeded with a subject that could have been disastrous. Blogcritics found it "tastelessly hilarious".  French site Horreur.com was a bit more measured in its praise, suggesting a mixture of laughter and gritting of teeth as an appropriate reaction but awarded a rating of 5/6.

Release 
It was an official selection at the Calgary International Film Festival and Westwood International Film Festival. It was released on DVD by Troma.

References

External links 
 Special Needs at Internet Movie Database
 Special Needs – at the Troma Entertainment movie database
 Special Needs at Official Movie Website

2006 films
Troma Entertainment films
2006 black comedy films
2006 comedy films